Sasaella is a genus of Japanese bamboo in the grass family.

Species
 Sasaella bitchuensis (Makino) Koidz – southern Honshu
 Sasaella caudiceps (Koidz.) Koidz. – Honshu
 Sasaella hidaensis (Makino) Makino, Hishu zasa – Honshu, Shikoku
 Sasaella hisauchii (Makino) Makino, Hime suzu – Honshu, Shikoku
 Sasaella kogasensis (Nakai) Nakai ex Koidz,  Kogashi azuma zasa – Hokkaido, Honshu
 Sasaella leucorhoda (Koidz.) Koidz. – Honshu
 Sasaella masamuneana (Makino) Hatsushima & Muroi, Genkei chiku – Japan
 Sasaella ramosa  (Makino) Makino, Azuma zasa – Japan; naturalized in Great Britain + New Zealand
 Sasaella sadoensis (Makino ex Koidz.) Sad.Suzuki – Honshu
 Sasaella sawadae (Makino) Makino ex Koidzum – Honshu
 Sasaella shiobarensis (Nakai) Koidz. – Honshu

formerly included
species now included in other genera: Pleioblastus Sasa

References

Bambusoideae
Bambusoideae genera
Endemic flora of Japan

nl:Sasaella